Essential thrombocythemia (ET) is a rare chronic blood cancer (myeloproliferative neoplasm) characterised by the overproduction of platelets (thrombocytes) by megakaryocytes in the bone marrow. It may, albeit rarely, develop into acute myeloid leukemia or myelofibrosis. It is a type of myeloproliferative neoplasm (blood cancers) wherein the body makes too many white or red blood cells, or platelets.

Signs and symptoms
Most people with essential thrombocythemia are without symptoms at the time of diagnosis, which is usually made after noting an elevated platelet level on a routine complete blood count (CBC). The most common symptoms are bleeding (due to dysfunctional platelets), blood clots (e.g., deep vein thrombosis or pulmonary embolism), fatigue, headache, nausea, vomiting, abdominal pain, visual disturbances, dizziness, fainting, and numbness in the extremities; the most common signs are increased white blood cell count, reduced red blood cell count, and an enlarged spleen.

Cause
In ET, megakaryocytes are more sensitive to growth factors. Platelets derived from the abnormal megakaryocytes are activated, which, along with the elevated platelet count, contributes to the likelihood of forming blood clots. The increased possibility of bleeding when the platelet count is over 1 million is due to von Willebrand factor (vWF) sequestration by the increased mass of platelets, leaving insufficient vWF for platelet adhesion. A mutation in the JAK2 kinase (V617F) is present in 40–50% of cases and is diagnostic if present. JAK2 is a member of the Janus kinase family.

In 2013, two groups detected calreticulin mutations in a majority of JAK2-negative/MPL-negative patients with essential thrombocythemia and primary myelofibrosis, which makes CALR mutations the second most common in myeloproliferative neoplasms. All mutations (insertions or deletions) affected the last exon, generating a reading frame shift of the resulting protein, that creates a novel terminal peptide and causes a loss of endoplasmic reticulum KDEL retention signal.

Diagnosis
The following revised diagnostic criteria for essential thrombocythemia were proposed in 2005. The diagnosis requires the presence of both A criteria together with B3 to B6, or of criterion A1 together with B1 to B6. The criteria are as follows:
 A1. Platelet count > 400 × 103/µL for at least 2 months.
 A2. Acquired V617F JAK2 mutation present
 B1. No cause for a reactive thrombocytosis
 normal inflammatory indices
 B2. No evidence of iron deficiency
 stainable iron in the bone marrow or normal red cell mean corpuscular volume
 B3. No evidence of polycythemia vera
 hematocrit < midpoint of normal range or normal red cell mass in presence of normal iron stores
 B4. No evidence of chronic myeloid leukemia
 But the Philadelphia chromosome may be present in up to 10% of cases. Patients with the Philadelphia chromosome have a potential for the development of acute leukemia, especially acute lymphocytic leukemia.
 B5. No evidence of myelofibrosis
 no collagen fibrosis and ≤ grade 2 reticulin fibrosis (using 0–4 scale)
 B6. No evidence of a myelodysplastic syndrome
 no significant dysplasia
 no cytogenetic abnormalities suggestive of myelodysplasia

Treatment

Indications
Not all those affected will require treatment at presentation. People are usually split up into low and high risk for bleeding/blood clotting groups (based on their age, their medical history, their blood counts and their lifestyles), low risk individuals are usually treated with aspirin, whereas those at high risk are given hydroxycarbamide and/or other treatments that reduce platelet count (such as interferon-α and anagrelide).

Agents
Hydroxycarbamide, interferon-α and anagrelide can lower the platelet count. Low-dose aspirin is used to reduce the risk of blood clot formation unless the platelet count is very high, where there is a risk of bleeding from the disease, and hence this measure would be counter-productive as aspirin-use increases the risk of bleeding.

The PT1 study compared hydroxyurea plus aspirin to anagrelide plus aspirin as initial therapy for ET.  Hydroxyurea treated patients had a lower incidence of arterial thrombosis, lower incidence of severe bleeding and lower incidence of transformation to myelofibrosis, but the risk of venous thrombosis was higher with hydroxycarbamide than with anagrelide. It is unknown whether the results are applicable to all ET patients. In people with symptomatic ET and extremely high platelet counts (exceeding 1 million), plateletpheresis can be used to remove platelets from the blood to reduce the risk of thrombosis.

Prognosis
Essential thrombocythemia is sometimes described as a slowly progressive disorder with long asymptomatic periods punctuated by thrombotic or hemorrhagic events. However, well-documented medical regimens can reduce and control the number of platelets, which reduces the risk of these thrombotic or hemorrhagic events. The lifespan of a well-controlled ET person is well within the expected range for a person of similar age but without ET. ET is the myeloproliferative neoplasm least likely to progress to acute myeloid leukemia.

Epidemiology
The incidence of ET is 0.6-2.5/100,000 per year, the median age at onset is 65–70 years and it is more frequent in females than in males. The incidence in children is 0.09/100,000 per year.

Pregnancy
Hydroxycarbamide and anagrelide are contraindicated during pregnancy and nursing. Essential thrombocythemia can be linked with a three-fold increase in risk of miscarriage. Throughout pregnancy, close monitoring of the mother and fetus is recommended. Low-dose low molecular weight heparin (e.g. enoxaparin) may be used. For life-threatening complications, the platelet count can be reduced rapidly using plateletpheresis, a procedure that removes platelets from the blood and returns the remainder to the patient.

References

External links 

Myeloid neoplasia
Coagulopathies